The 1994 season was the third season of football in Armenia following the break-up of the Soviet Union. Professional football consisted of two divisions, the Armenian Premier League (containing 16 teams) and the Armenian First League (ten teams). Out of the sixteen Premier League teams, five would be relegated, while only the First League winner would be promoted for the 1995 season, reducing the top level to twelve clubs.

Premier League
 FC Zangezour, FC Lori and Aznavour FC were promoted.
 Before the start of the season Impulse FC withdrew from competition.
 FC Zvartnots Echmiadzin were renamed BMA-Arai Echmiadzin.

League table

Top goalscorers

First League
 BKMA Yerevan were promoted out of the Armenian Second League.
 Malatia-Kilikia Yerevan un-merged their original merger (FC Malatia and Kilikia F.C.) and once again became two different clubs. Neither of the two however participated in any competition in 1993.
 Before the start of the season Akhtamar Sevan, FC Artashat, FIMA Yerevan, FC Masis, Araks Armavir, FC Karin, FC Luys-Ararat and Hachen FC withdrew from competition.
 Lernagorts Vardenis FC changed their name to Sipan Vardenis.
 Momik FC of Yeghegnadzor changed their name to Arpa FC.
 Avtogen Vanadzor changed their name back to FC Vanadzor.

League table

Armenia Cup

External links
 RSSSF: Armenia 1994